Dr. Harcharan Singh (1914–2006) was an Indian dramatist and writer in the Punjabi language. He dedicated 69 years of his life to Punjabi theater, in which he authored 51 books and staged numerous plays all over the world.

Life
Singh was born in 1914 at Chak # 576, near Nankana Sahib (now in Pakistan) to father, Kirpa Singh, and mother, Rakkhi. He was sent to his ancestral village, Urapar in Jalandhar District, for education. After passing class 8th from the Govt. School, Chakdanna, Singh was sent to Khalsa School, Jalandhar, for Matric (Class 10). Singh enrolled in B.A. at Khalsa College, Amritsar in 1933. Then he obtained his master's degree in Punjabi and history from FC College Lahore. Moreover, he earned his Ph.D. degree in orientalism and oriental history, with particular emphasis on classical, pre-Maurya Indo-Aryan dynasties of the Punjab and Himalayas for his thesis "Theatre Traditions in Punjab" from Delhi University in 1943.

He was the head of Punjabi Dept., Punjabi University, Patiala, for 10 years, from 1965 to 1975. He held the post of chairman at the Punjab Sangeet Natak Academy from 1982 to 1991 and again from 1994 to 1997. He was then appointed the chairman of Punjab Arts Council, Chandigarh, from 1999 to 2002.

Writing
Singh wrote his first play, Kamla Kumari, in 1937, which was first staged in Amritsar on 21 January 1938. He established the Punjab Art Theatre at Lahore in 1939 and popularized theatrical activities in Punjab. He initiated a trend in Punjabi theatre with his wife Dharam Kaur, who dared to act female role in his play Anjorh, staged at YMCA Hall Lahore in 1939. This paved the way for women on Punjabi stage.

Singh authored 51 books in Punjabi. He was an authority on Sikh historical plays. His well-known historical plays are Chamkaur Di Garhi, Punian Da Chan, Miti Dhundh Jag Chanan Hoa, Jafarnama, Sarhand Di Kandh, Hind Di Chadar, Rani Jindan, Kama Gata Maru and Shubh Karman Te Kabh Hoon Na Taron. The play Chamkaur Di Garhi was first staged on the occasion of the tercentenary birth celebration of Shri Guru Gobind Singh at famous Sunmukh Nanda Auditorium, Bombay, in December 1966. For the last 38 years, different theatrical groups have been staging this play in India and abroad. Six of his plays have been translated into Hindi and one into Russian.

About a dozen of his books have won awards. He was given the prestigious Sahitya Academy Award in 1973 for his play Kal Aj Te Bhalak (Yesterday, Today and Tomorrow). He was honored by Punjab Govt. as Shromani Sahitkar in 1974. Besides these decorations he was honored by more than a dozen national and international institutions. The feature film Sarbansdani Guru Gobind Singh was based on his famous play Chamkaur Di Garhi. His historical play Rani Jindan was performed by Punjabi Kala Kendra Chandigarh in 20 big cities of Canada and the US in 1981.

Singh wrote the scripts of Bole So Nihal, (a world-famous multimedia Sight & Sound Panorama on 500 years of Sikh History, specially produced for the Birth of Khalsa celebrations,) Sher-e-Punjab (a multimedia Sight & Sound Panorama on 40 glorious years of Khalsa Raj) and Guru Maneo Granth, (another mega multi-media sight & sound panorama dedicated to the 400th centenary of the Prakash of Sri Guru Granth Sahib). These shows have been shown in 50 cities of Punjab and India besides in 54 major cities of the US, Canada and UK since 1999.

List of books

References

Indian male dramatists and playwrights
Punjabi-language writers
2006 deaths
Dramatists and playwrights from Punjab, India
Recipients of the Sahitya Akademi Award in Punjabi
1914 births
Indian male short story writers
20th-century Indian dramatists and playwrights
Academic staff of Punjabi University
Sangeet Natak Akademi
20th-century Indian short story writers
20th-century Indian male writers